The 1948–49 OB I bajnokság season was the 12th season of the OB I bajnokság, the top level of ice hockey in Hungary. Five teams participated in the league, and MTK Budapest won the championship.

Regular season

External links
 Season on hockeyarchives.info

Hun
OB I bajnoksag seasons
1948–49 in Hungarian ice hockey